Irina Ryazanova Ermolova (born 1938) is a former female tennis player who competed for the Soviet Union.

She played in Singles at the Wimbledon in 1960. She lost to the British Pat Hales in the First Round. Her partner in Women's Doubles, citizen Anna Dmitrieva lost in the Second Round to the British players Elaine Shenton and Liz Starkie. Her partner in mixed doubles citizen Toomas Leius lost in the Second Round to the British players Humphrey Truman and Christine Truman.

Career finals

Singles (4–4)

Doubles (10–4)

References

1938 births
Living people
Soviet female tennis players
Universiade medalists in tennis
Universiade gold medalists for the Soviet Union
Universiade silver medalists for the Soviet Union
Medalists at the 1959 Summer Universiade
Medalists at the 1963 Summer Universiade
Medalists at the 1965 Summer Universiade